Northgate Church, Chester, is located in Upper Northgate Street, Chester, Cheshire, England.

History

It was originally built in 1874 as a Congregational church, and was designed by the local architect T. M. Lockwood.

Architecture

The church is constructed with a front in yellow sandstone, and the sides and rear in brick.  The roof is slated.  It is described by the authors of the Buildings of England series as "quite a landmark". The church is recorded in the National Heritage List for England as a designated Grade II listed building.

See also

Grade II listed buildings in Chester (north and west)

References

Grade II listed churches in Cheshire
Churches completed in 1874
Northgate Church
Grade II listed buildings in Chester